The Indonesian electoral law of 2017, also known in Indonesia as Undang-Undang Pemilu, is the law regulating elections in Indonesia. Officially, it is known as the Law Number 7 of 2017 (Undang-Undang Nomor 7 Tahun 2017, or UU 7/2017). The law was passed in July 2017 following nine months of debate in the People's Representative Council.

On 12 December 2022, amendment of the law, Government Regulation in Lieu of Law No. 1/2022 issued.

History
In anticipation for the simultaneous elections of 2019, the government-initiated work on the draft for a new electoral law to replace the 2012 law. By August 2016, president Joko Widodo has received the draft law, and the People's Representative Council received it on 21 October the same year. During the discussion of the law, there were disputes over the proposed presidential threshold, with political parties divided into three camps – PDI-P, Golkar and Nasdem supported a higher threshold of 25% legislative vote/20% parliamentary seats, Gerindra, PAN and Demokrat supporting the removal of the threshold, and PKB and PPP supporting a lower threshold of 15% legislative vote/10% parliamentary seats.

The draft was voted into law on 20 July 2017. During the voting procedure, opposing parties – Gerindra, PAN, PKS and Demokrat conducted a mass walkout with all their members, which includes three deputy speakers, except for another deputy speaker Fahri Hamzah who decided to remain. All remaining parties of the government coalition approved the 20 percent presidential threshold (Option A), with Hamzah the only opposition.

Characteristics

Seat distribution
The 2017 law mandates an addition of 15 seats to the People's Representative Council, increasing the number to 575 divided across 80 electoral districts with 3-10 seats each, the additions given to provinces outside Java. In 2022 amendment of the law, the number of the member increased to 580, and expanded the electoral districts to 84. 

The law sets the number of seats for local councils as the following:

Provincial:Art. 188

Regency/Municipal:Art. 191

The seats are also distributed in electoral districts with 3-12 members each. The law requires these electoral districts to follow the administrative borders of regencies/cities (provincial and national) or subdistricts (regency/city) if possible, though partition of a subdivision into multiple districts is allowed if not possible otherwise.:Art. 187,189,192

In total, the law mandated 20,392 non-independent legislative posts – 575 in the People's Representative Council, 2,207 in the Provincial Councils and 17,610 in the Regency/Municipal Councils.

Electoral system
The law maintains the electoral system used in 2014, using the open list system. Voters could vote directly for the candidate they wanted in a list of candidate names presented by party. The candidates are then ranked by vote in their respective parties, and the party's quota is determined through the Webster/Sainte-Laguë method after elimination of parties not meeting the threshold.

For presidential candidates, the winning candidate is determined by simple majority, with runoff voting for the top two candidates if no candidates managed to secure a first round majority. In addition, the winning candidate must secure at least 20% of votes in over half of the provinces (i.e. more than 17).:Art. 416

Thresholds
During the previous election, parties are required to pass a parliamentary threshold of 3.5% in order to be represented in the People's Representative Council. The law increased this threshold to 4%. The presidential threshold was decided at the 25%/20% option, in which parties would need a total of 20% (112 for the 2019 election) legislative seats from the 2014 election, or 25% of the popular vote from 2014.

The threshold does not apply to local legislative elections, and all participating parties may win seats in provincial and municipal councils regardless of their total national vote.

Others
The law increased limits to campaign contributions – from Rp 1 billion to Rp 2.5 billion for individuals, and Rp 7.5 billion to Rp 25 billion for legal entities or corporations. In addition, it allowed political parties which participated in the 2014 election to skip party verification, despite the addition of North Kalimantan as a province requiring party offices.

Lawsuit
The law has been challenged in the Constitutional Court. A lawsuit by Vice President Jusuf Kalla on the term limits set by articles 169 and 227 was rejected in June 2018. A judicial review was also submitted regarding the presidential threshold (art. 222). A lawsuit to article 182, which did not explicitly prohibit political party functionaries to be elected into the Regional Representative Council, won in July 2018.

Notes

References

Law of Indonesia
Election law
Elections in Indonesia
2017 in Indonesia